BBC Lifestyle is an international television channel wholly owned by BBC Studios. The channel provides six programming strands: Food, Home & Design, Fashion & Style, Health, Parenting, and Personal Development.

On 1 August 2019, BBC Lifestyle along with BBC Earth rebranded.

Launch dates
BBC Lifestyle first launched in Singapore on mio TV in July 2007 (it is now on Singtel TV). It is also available in Hong Kong on now TV, in Poland on the Cyfrowy Polsat digital satellite platform, where it launched in December 2007, and in Romania on Digi TV digital cable television, where it launched on 31 December 2010. It has been available on DStv in South Africa and on OSN in the Middle East and North Africa since September 2008. Since then, it has also launched in the Scandinavian countries in November 2008, where it replaced BBC Prime on Canal Digital, Com Hem, Telia Digital-TV and FastTV.

In June 2009, hollywoodreporter.com cited the lack of viewership on SingTel's mio TV as the reason that the British Broadcasting Corporation terminated the right to air BBC Lifestyle, CBeebies and BBC Knowledge under permission registered BBC from 19 March 2009 to 15 December 2009. The BBC has since sourced StarHub TV as an alternative offering. Thus BBC Lifestyle is now on channel 432 on StarHub TV. However, as of 1 December 2021, BBC Lifestyle together with CBeebies made its return to Singtel TV along with the launch of BBC World News, BBC Earth and BBC First onto the platform.

BBC Lifestyle ceased broadcast in the Nordic region on 6 January 2016.

Programming

See also
BBC World News
BBC Knowledge
BBC Entertainment
CBeebies
BBC First
BBC HD
BBC Earth

References

External links
 BBC Lifestyle official website

International BBC television channels
BBC Worldwide